Louiza Abouriche is an Algerian karateka. She won the gold medal in the women's 55kg event at the 2022 Mediterranean Games held in Oran, Algeria. She won the silver medal in the women's 55kg event at the 2021 Islamic Solidarity Games held in Konya, Turkey.

Achievements

References

External links 
 

Living people
Year of birth missing (living people)
Place of birth missing (living people)
Algerian female karateka
Competitors at the 2022 Mediterranean Games
Mediterranean Games medalists in karate
Mediterranean Games gold medalists for Algeria
Islamic Solidarity Games medalists in karate
Islamic Solidarity Games competitors for Algeria
21st-century Algerian women